Marco Antonio Figueroa Valle (born December 4, 1989, in Ayutla, Jalisco) is a Mexican professional footballer who last played for Potros UAEM.

References

External links
 

1989 births
Living people
Association football defenders
C.D. Veracruz footballers
La Piedad footballers
Tecamachalco F.C. footballers
Alebrijes de Oaxaca players
Potros UAEM footballers
Ascenso MX players
Liga Premier de México players
Footballers from Jalisco
Mexican footballers